The Southwest Holly Springs Historic District in Holly Springs, Mississippi is a  historic district that was listed on the National Register of Historic Places in 1983.  Of the 80 buildings in the district, 53 are considered as adding to its architectural or historical significance.

All of the properties in the district are residences.  Construction dates range from the mid 1800s to the mid 1900s.  Many of the homes are on tree lined streets with large yards.

Walter Place, Fort Daniel Place, Fleur-de-Lis, and Mimosas are among the prominent residences.

References

Holly Springs, Mississippi
Historic districts on the National Register of Historic Places in Mississippi
National Register of Historic Places in Marshall County, Mississippi